Christof Geiß, also called Geiss Hahn or Geiß Hahn, is a German mathematician.

Geiß studied mathematics at the University of Bayreuth, where he received in 1990 his Diplom with Diplomarbeit Darstellungsendliche Algebren und multiplikative Basen and in 1993 his doctorate. His doctoral thesis Tame distributive algebras and related topics was written under the supervision of Wolfgang Erich Müller and José Antonio de la Peña. Geiß does research and teaches at the Universidad Nacional Autónoma de México (UNAM), where he studied already in 1991/92 and became in 1993 an Investigador Associado. He is there an Investigador Titular C.

His research deals with cluster algebras in Lie theory and their categorization, pre-projective algebras, and quivers in combination with symmetric Cartan matrices.

In 2018 Geiß was an Invited Speaker with talk Quivers with relations for symmetrizable Cartan matrices and algebraic Lie Theory at the International Congress of Mathematics.

Selected publications
 
 with Bernard Leclerc and Jan Schröer: 
 with Bernard Leclerc and Jan Schröer: 
 with Bernard Leclerc and Jan Schröer: 
 with Bernard Leclerc and Jan Schröer: 
 with Bernard Leclerc and Jan Schröer: 
 with Bernard Leclerc and Jan Schröer: 
 with Bernard Leclerc and Jan Schröer: 
 with Bernard Leclerc and Jan Schröer:

References

Living people
20th-century German mathematicians
21st-century German mathematicians
University of Bayreuth alumni
Academic staff of the National Autonomous University of Mexico
Year of birth missing (living people)